Freberg is a small village and statistical area (grunnkrets) in Sandefjord municipality, Norway.

The statistical area Freberg, which also can include the peripheral parts of the village as well as the surrounding countryside, has a population of 141.

Freberg is located between Gokstad to the west and Lahelle to the east. It is considered a part of the urban settlement Sandefjord, which covers the greater Sandefjord city area and stretches towards Stokke and into peripheral parts of Larvik municipality. The urban settlement Sandefjord has a population of 39,849, of which 39,144 people live within Sandefjord.

References

Villages in Vestfold og Telemark